The L&YR Class 24 was a class of short-wheelbase  steam locomotives of the Lancashire and Yorkshire Railway (L&YR). It was designed by Aspinall and introduced in 1897 for shunting  duties. Twenty locomotives were built, but six were withdrawn between 1917 and 1922.

They were notable for the first design of a locomotive in Britain to use a Belpaire firebox and its first use on the L&YR.

Design and construction
They were designed for use in freight yards with sharp curves and steep inclines where more power was needed than that provided by alternative  Aspinall Pugs.

This was the first time for a new build on the L&YR a Belpaire firebox was used.  The short-wheelbase design included outside cylinders with Richardson balanced valves on top; these being controlled by a combination of Allan motion and rocking shaft.

Modifications
The steam reversing gear, helpful for faster shunting operations, was later replaced by a screw which negated this effect.  The push and pull regulator handle seemed to have been responsible for a number of minor accidents through lack of fine control was also replaced by a standard type.  Those working in the Liverpool docks area had bells fitted beneath the boiler.

Seven of the remaining engines were re-built with Barton Wright type round top boilers around the 1917–1919 period.

Fleet

Service
The class was allocated mostly to yards in the Liverpool area with Newton Heath and Agecroft depots receiving a number for use in their local larger marshalling yards.  One based at Ormskirk was noted for performing on the main line between shunting duties.

Fourteen locomotives passed to the London, Midland and Scottish Railway at the grouping in 1923.  After further withdrawals, 5 locomotives passed to British Railways (BR) in 1948 and they were numbered as shown in the table above.   All had been withdrawn by 1961. None were preserved.

See also
 LMS Fowler Dock Tank, a similar LMS design which also incorporated outside cylinders regarded as unusual practice for a dock tank

References

Sources and further reading

0-6-0T locomotives
24
Railway locomotives introduced in 1897
Standard gauge steam locomotives of Great Britain
Scrapped locomotives